Seventy of the one hundred and twenty members of the New Zealand House of Representatives elected in New Zealand's 2008 general election will be from single member constituencies, an increase of one electorate seat from 2005. The initial composition of the 2005 Parliament gave the Labour and National parties each 31 constituencies, the Māori Party four and ACT, United Future and the Progressive Party one each.

The election was held on Saturday, 8 November. Nominations for constituency candidates closed at noon on Wednesday, 14 October; this is the final list.

Lines coloured pink denote an MP elected from a party list; lines coloured beige denote the winner of the constituency vote.

General electorates



Bay of Plenty

Botany
New seat

Christchurch Central
Incumbent Tim Barnett of the Labour Party retired at the 2008 election, having been the MP for Christchurch Central since 1996.

Christchurch East

Clutha-Southland

Coromandel

Dunedin North

Dunedin South
Incumbent Labour MP David Benson-Pope was deselected in 2008, having served as MP for Dunedin South since 1999.

East Coast

East Coast Bays

Epsom

Hamilton East

Hamilton West

Helensville

New seat largely replacing the old Port Waikato seat.

Hutt South

Ilam

Invercargill

Kaikōura

Mana

Māngere
Sitting MP Taito Phillip Field was expelled from the Labour Party in 2007 and will contest the seat for the New Zealand Pacific Party.

Manukau East

Manurewa

Maungakiekie
Sitting Labour MP Mark Gosche is retiring in 2008, having served as electorate MP for Maungakiekie since 1999.

Mount Albert

Mount Roskill

Napier

Nelson

New Lynn

New Plymouth

North Shore

Northcote

Northland

Ōhariu
new seat largely replacing Ōhariu-Belmont.

Ōtaki

Pakuranga

Palmerston North
Sitting Labour MP Steve Maharey is retiring at the 2008 election, having been MP for the seat since 1990.

Papakura
New seat largely replacing the old Clevedon seat.

Port Hills
New seat largely replacing the old Banks Peninsula seat.

Rangitata
New seat

Rangitīkei

Rimutaka
Incumbent MP Paul Swain of the Labour Party stood down as MP for Rimutaka after twelve years, having served various Hutt Valley electorates since 1990.

Rodney

Rongotai

Rotorua

Selwyn
New seat largely replacing the old Rakaia seat.

Tāmaki

Taranaki-King Country

Taupō

Tauranga
Incumbent MP Bob Clarkson of the National Party is retiring in 2008, having served as MP for Tauranga since 2005.

Te Atatū

Tukituki

Waikato
New seat largely replacing the old  seat.

Waimakariri

Wairarapa

Waitakere

Waitaki
New seat largely replacing the old Otago seat.

Incumbent Labour MP Marian Hobbs is retiring at the 2008 election, having served the seat since 1999.

West Coast-Tasman

Whanganui

Whangarei

Wigram

Māori electorates

Hauraki-Waikato
New seat replacing the old Tainui seat.

Ikaroa-Rāwhiti

Tāmaki Makaurau

Te Tai Hauāuru

Te Tai Tokerau

Te Tai Tonga

Waiariki

See also
2008 New Zealand general election
Opinion polling for the 2008 New Zealand general election

References

2008 New Zealand general election
Candidates 2008